This is a list of notable Zulu people.

Kings, Chiefs, princes and princesses

 King Zulu kaMalandela, founder of the Zulu clan
 King Shaka kaSenzangakhona, founder of the Zulu Nation
 King Goodwill Zwelithini kaBhekuzulu, Zulu king 
 King Senzangakhona kaJama, Zulu king and father of Shaka
 Mkabayi kaJama, Zulu princess and sister of Senzangakhona
 Nandi, Mhlongo princess and mother of Shaka
 Magogo kaDinuzulu, Zulu princess and mother of Mangosuthu Buthelezi
 Nomusa kaBhekuzulu, Zulu princess, Regent Queen of AmaRharhabe and sister of Zwelithini
 Mangosuthu Buthelezi, Buthelezi prince
 Bhambatha kaMancinza, Zulu chief
 Dabulamanzi kaMpande, Zulu commander
 Dingiswayo, Mthethwa chief, mentor of Shaka Zulu
 Albert Lutuli, chief of Zulu Christian
 Langa KaXaba, the Ndwandwe, king nation
 Matshobana KaMangete, the chief of the Northern Khumalo
 Sigananda kaSokufa, Zulu aristocrat
 Zwangendaba, Shaka's general
 Zwide kaLanga, the Ndwandwe king nation
 Ntshingwayo Khoza, InDuna of Khoza
 Umhlangana kaSenzangakhona, Zulu prince
 Ndlela kaSompisi, InDuna for Shaka and Dingaan
 Nongalaza KaNondela, inDuna for Mpande
 Zibhebhu kaMaphitha, Zulu chief
 Mbongeleni Zondi, Zulu chief and great-grandson of Inkosi Bambatha kaMancinza
 Nothando Dube as known as Inkhosikati LaDube, member of the House of Dlamini as the twelfth wife of King Mswati III of Eswatini

Politicians and activists
 Edward Bhengu, founder member of the PAC
 Sibusiso Bengu, Minister of Education, ambassador to Germany
 Mangosuthu Buthelezi, founder and first president of the Inkatha Freedom Party
 Bheki Cele, former national S.A. police commissioner and police minister
 Siyabonga Cwele, former minister of communication; intelligence service; state security; home affairs
 Thoko Didiza, former Minister of Agriculture and Land Affairs and Minister of Agriculture, Land Reform and Rural Development
 Jackson Mthembu, former Minister in the Presidency
 Bathabile Dlamini, ANC Women's League leader
 Nkosazana Clarice Dlamini-Zuma, chairperson of the African Union Commission 
 John Langalibalele Dube, first President of the African National Congress, founder of the Ohlange Institute, educator
 Nokutela Dube, wife of John L. Dube, founder of the Ohlange Institute
 Malusi Gigaba, Minister of Home Affairs
 Archie Gumede, lawyer, politician, activist
 Josiah Tshangana Gumede, politician and father of Archie Gumede
 Zandile Gumede, former Mayor of Durban
 Harry Gwala, ANC and communist activist
 Nkululeko Gwala, political activist
 Princess Constance Magogo Sibilile Mantithi Ngangezinye kaDinuzulu, Zulu princess, ethnomusicologist and composer
 Velenkosini Hlabisa, Inkatha Freedom Party leader
 Mbali Ntuli, member of the Democratic Alliance
 Mxolisi Kaunda, Mayor of Durban
 Makoti Khawula, EFF Member of Parliament and former anti-apartheid activist
 Ntombikayise Priscilla Khubeka, anti-apartheid activist
 Duma Kumalo, South African human rights activist and one of the Sharpeville Six
 Dumisani Kumalo, South African politician
 Ellen Kuzwayo, political activist
 Anton Lembede, political activist
 Chief Albert Luthuli, President of the African National Congress and first South African Nobel Peace Prize laureate
 Zanele kaMagwaza-Msibi, Deputy Minister of Science and Technology, founder of the National Freedom Party (splinter from the IFP)
 Moses Mabhida, political activist
 Nozizwe Charlotte Madlala-Routledge, South African politician, former Deputy Minister of Defence and former Deputy Minister of Health
 Amos Masondo, Chairperson of the National Council of Provinces
 Veronica Mate-Sobukwe, political activist and wife of Robert Sobukwe
 Joseph Mathunjwa, trade union leader and the head of the Association of Mineworkers and Construction Union (AMCU)
 Lindiwe Mazibuko, South African politician and musician 
 Seth Mazibuko, political activist
 Tryphina Mboxela Jokweni, political activist
 Senzo Mchunu, former premier of KwaZulu-Natal
 Willies Mchunu, former premier of KwaZulu-Natal
 Bandile Mdlalose, 2014 general secretary of the South African shackdwellers' movement Abahlali baseMjondolo
 Frank Mdlalose, first former premier of KwaZulu-Natal
 Richard Mdluli, former head of Police Crime Intelligence
 Bertha Mkhize, political activist
 Florence Mkhize, political activist
 Nomhlangano Beauty Mkhize, South African activist, politician, shop steward and wife to late Saul Mkhize
 Zweli Mkhize, former premier of KwaZulu-Natal and former treasure of ANC
 Obed Mlaba, former Mayor of Durban
 Johnson Mlambo, revolutionary
 Phumzile Mlambo-Ngcuka, first female deputy president of South Africa (2005-2008)
 Zwakele Mncwango, former Leader of the Opposition in the KwaZulu-Natal Legislature
 James Mpanza, political activist
 Saul Msane, South African politician and intellectual
 Bongani Msomi, UDM secretary
 Ricardo Mthembu, political activist
 Nathi Mthethwa, Minister of Arts and Culture
 Siphiwe Mvuyane, IFP member and police officer
 Sibusiso Ndebele, former Minister of Correctional Services, former premier of KwaZulu-Natal
 Phila Portia Ndwandwe, anti-apartheid activist
 Chris Ngcobo, former head of Police Intelligence
 Sipho Ngwenya, political activist
 Ben Ngubane, former chair of the South African Broadcasting Corporation, and former premier of KwaZulu-Natal
 Mxolisi Nxasana, Director of Public Prosecutions in South Africa 
 Sizwe Nxasana, South African businessman
 Mzala Nxumalo, political activist
 Dorothy Nyembe, political activist
 Blade Nzimande, Minister of Higher Education
 Nqobile Nzuza, resident in the Marikana Land Occupation
 Jeff Radebe, Minister in the Presidency for Planning, Performance, Monitoring, Evaluation and Administration
 Pixley ka Isaka Seme, founder of the African National Congress and first black lawyer in South Africa
 Gert Sibande, political activist
 Sihle Zikalala, premier of KwaZulu-Natal
 Sbu Zikode, political activists
 Andrew Zondo, former Umkhonto we Sizwe activist
 Lindiwe Zulu, South Africa's Minister of Small Business Development
 Jacob Zuma, former President of the Republic of South Africa

Religion leaders
 Nicholas Bhengu, Assemblies of God founder
 John L. Dube, Christian preacher
 Smangaliso Mkhatshwa, Catholic priest
 Saul Msane, Wesleyan Methodist Church member
 Vusamazulu Credo Mutwa, Zulu traditional healer
 Selby Mvusi, theologian and artist
 Isaiah Shembe, Church of Nazareth founder

Business and professional figures
 Robert Gumede
 Khanyi Dhlomo, TV host and the founder and CEO of Ndalo Media and Ndalo Luxury Ventures
 Sizwe Nxasana, former CEO of First Rand, Telkom (South Africa) & former chairman of NSFAS.
 Phuthuma Nhleko, former CEO of the MTN Group
 Nonkululeko Nyembezi-Heita, CEO of the Dutch mining group, IchorCoal N.V., CEO of the JSE Limited & Chairperson of Alexander Forbes
 Duduzane Zuma, businessman and son of Jacob Zuma
 Khulubuse Zuma, businessman and nephew of Jacob Zuma

Academics, educators, and writers

 Zodwa Dlamini, biochemist
 Zodwa Dlamini, scientist
 Herbert Isaac Ernest Dhlomo, author, educator
 Rolfes Robert Reginald Dhlomo, author
 Nokutela Dube, educator, Christian preacher
 Magema Magwaza Fuze, author
 Mafika Gwala, poet, editor
 John Hlophe, judge president of the Western Division
 Bheki W. J. Langa, diplomatic
 Mandla Langa, poet
 Pius Langa, former chief justice
 Brenda Lindiwe Mabaso-Chipeio, South African international trade expert
 Sizwe Mabizela, vice-chancellor of Rhodes University
 Tholie Madala, judge in the Constitutional Court of South Africa
 Dunstan Mlambo, judge  president of the Gauteng Division of the High Court of South Africa
 Oswald Mbuyiseni Mtshali, author
 Vusamazulu Credo Mutwa, author and Zulu traditional healer
 Njabulo Ndebele, former Vice Chancellor of the University of Cape Town, writer
 Sandile Ngcobo, former chief justice
 Lewis Nkosi, South African writer
 Mxolisi Nxasana, former National Prosecuting Authority director
 Henry Nxumalo, investigating journalist
 Sibusiso Nyembezi, Zulu writer, novelist, poetry and scholar
 Menzi Simelane, former National Prosecuting Authority director
 Benedict Wallet Vilakazi, poet and novelist
 Raymond Zondo, Deputy Chief Justice of South Africa

Actors, TV & radio personalities
 Thuso Nokwanda Mbedu
 Nomzamo Mbatha, actress
 Baby Cele, actress
 Henry Cele, actor
 Pallance Dladla, actor
 Minnie Dlamini-Jones, on-air personality, actress and model
 Gugu Gumede, actress
 Kelly Khumalo, actress
 Leleti Khumalo, actress
 Dawn Thandeka King, actress
 Vusi Kunene, actor
 Khaya Dladla, actor/actress
 Nandi Madida, actress
 Mandla Maseko, aviator
 Bridget Masinga, 2002 Miss South Africa 2nd princess, actress, businesswoman
 Gugu Mbatha-Raw, actress
 Nomzamo Mbatha, actress and model
 Zamani Mbatha, actor
 Nomonde Mbusi, actress
 Ndaba Mhlongo, actor
 Somizi Mhlongo, actor
 Gcina Mhlophe, actress, storyteller, poet and politician
 Bafana Mlangeni, actor
 Don Eric Mlangeni, actor
 Roland Mqwebu, actor
 Masoja Msiza, actor
 Duma Ndlovu, filmmaker, playwright, director and screenwriter 
 Mbongeni Ngema, writer, lyricist, composer, director and theatre producer
 Shadrack Ngema, actor and sport commentator
 Menzi Ngubane, actor
 Mimi Ndiweni, actress
 Jessica Nkosi, actress
 Lindani Nkosi, actor
 Lalela Mswane, Miss South Africa 2021
 Winnie Ntshaba, actress
 Nandi Nyembe, actress
 Lunga Shabalala, actor and television personality
 Sjava, actor and musician
 Siyabonga Shibe, actor
 Linda Sibiya, radio host, radio producer, DJ, television producer, television host and broadcaster
 Linda Sokhulu, actress
 Thando Thabethe, actress, radio and television personality
 Pearl Thusi, actress, model, radio, and television personality
 Mary Twala, actress
 Thishiwe Ziqubu, actress
 Eddie Zondi, radio personality and music composer
 Thandeka Zulu, actress
 Zuluboy, actor
 Gugulethu Zuma-Ncube, actress and producer
 Robert Marawa, sports broadcaster

Sport figures
 Makhosonke Bhengu, footballer
 Phumelele Bhengu, footballer
 Bafo Biyela, footballer
 Gideon Buthelezi, boxer
 Amanda Dlamini, footballer
 Ayanda Dlamini, footballer
 Thamsanqa Gabuza, footballer
 Siboniso Gaxa, footballer
 Siboniso Gumede, footballer
 Two-Boys Gumede, footballer
 Mhlengi Gwala, triathlete
 Andile Jali, footballer
 Mabhuti Khenyeza, footballer
 Doctor Khumalo, footballer
 Brilliant Khuzwayo, footballer
 Njabulo Ngcobo, footballer
 Mbulelo Mabizela, footballer
 Thulani Malinga, boxer
 Peter Mathebula, boxer
 Senzo Meyiwa, footballer
 Wiseman Meyiwa, footballer
 Brighton Mhlongo, footballer
 Helman Mkhalele, footballer
 Siyabonga Mpontshane, footballer
 Moruti Mthalane, boxer
 Emmanuel Ngobese, footballer
 Mlungisi Ngubane, footballer
 Siphelele Mthembu, footballer
 Siyabonga Nkosi, footballer
 Siyabonga Nomvethe, footballer
 Luyanda Ntshangase, footballer
 Siyabonga Sangweni, footballer
 Thabani Mthembu, footballer
 Thamsanqa Sangweni, footballer
 Thulani Hlatshwayo, footballer
 Lucas Sithole, tennis
 Lucas Sithole, sculptor
 Lucas Radebe, footballer
 Samkelo Radebe, Paralympic runner and gold medalist
 Siphiwe Tshabalala, footballer
 Benedict Vilakazi, footballer
 Sibusiso Vilakazi, footballer
 Cedric Xulu, footballer
 Siyanda Xulu, footballer
 Dumisani Zuma, footballer
 Sibusiso Zuma, footballer
 Bongani Zungu, footballer
 Themba Zwane, footballer

Musicians 
 Ladysmith Black Mambazo, musicians
 Toya Delazy, singer, pianist, dancer and performer
 Lucky Dube, reggae musician and Rastafarian
 Babes Wodumo, Gqom musician
 Big Nuz, music group
 Big Zulu, musician
 Black Coffee, record producer and DJ
 Doja Cat, (half Zulu, half Jewish), American musician
 Sun-El Musician, musician
 Earl Sweatshirt, American rapper
 DJ Clock, musician
 DJ Lag, Dj
 DJ Tira, musician
 DJ Zinhle, Dj and businesswoman
 Blaq Diamond, music duo
 Nandi Madida, musician and businesswoman
 Imithente, musicians
 Izingane Zoma, musicians
 Magogo kaDinuzulu, Zulu princess and artist
 Jabu Khanyile, musician
 Babes Wodumo, musician 
 Kelly Khumalo, musician
 K.O, rapper, musician
 Killer Kau, musician
 Sibongile Khumalo, musician
 Thokozani Langa, musician
 Solomon Linda
 Nomcebo Zikode, musician
 Bhekumuzi Luthuli, musician
 Sipho Mabuse, musician 
 Mandoza, musician
 Vusi Mahlasela, musician
 Mfaz'Omnyama, musician
 Phumlani Mgobhozi, musician
 Busi Mhlongo, virtuoso singer, dancer and composer
 Somizi Mhlongo, musician
 Bheki Mseleku, musician
 Sjava, musician and actor
 Nasty C, musician, rapper, songwriter and record producer
 Patrick Ngcobo, musician
 Shiyani Ngcobo, musician
 Zanefa Ngidi, musician
 Professor, musician, formally half of Tzozo and Professor
 Riky Rick, rapper
 Robert Sithole, musician
 Zola, musician, poet, actor and presenter
 Kwesta, rapper and songwriter
 Khaya Mthethwa, singer-songwriter, musician, composer, arranger, and the multi-instrumentalist
 Okmalumkoolkat, rapper
 Sello Twala, musician
 Vusi Ximba, musician
 Zakes Bantwini, musician
 Zakwe, musician
 Zuluboy, musician 
 Mlindo the Vocalist, musician
 Simmy, singer-songwriter, musician
 Distruction Boyz, DJ duo

Criminals
 Sibusiso Duma
Simon Majola
 Samuel Bongani Mfeka
 Elifasi Msomi
 Velaphi Ndlangamandla
 Moses Sithole
 Sipho Thwala
 Christopher Mhlengwa Zikode

See also
 List of Xhosa people
 List of South Africans
 List of Southern Ndebele people
 List of South African office-holders
 Zulu language
 Zulu people

Zulu

Zulu